North Oaks is an exurban city  north of St. Paul in Ramsey County in the U.S. state of Minnesota. The population was 4,469 at the 2010 census.

Formerly a gated community that now posts private access signage, all land is owned by homeowners with the North Oaks Home Owners Association maintaining all roads, plowing, parks, facilities, and recreation trails. Each homeowner's property extends halfway into the street. There is also a city government with a Mayor and City Council that administers basic services such as fire, police, planning, and licensing. The city owns no property.

History
Structured around Pleasant Lake, the area began as a water source for the Saint Paul municipal water system, which still maintains water access rights today. The land was later purchased by Saint Paul magnate James J. Hill in 1883 and expanded into a  breeding and hobby farm.

His son Louis Hill later owned North Oaks Farm until death in 1950. Ownership passed to Louis' children who decided to develop the land into a model residential community. They incorporated the North Oaks Company with a mission to build with respect for the natural environment, having witnessed metropolitan sprawl during this time. To ensure their mission would be fulfilled, land was subdivided and sold with a warranty deed that created the North Oaks Home Owners’ Association (NOHOA) to be responsible for roads and recreation. Each deed placed each home's property line halfway into the street, placing all roads into private ownership.

Remaining land in the city is owned by the North Oaks Company. The original farm buildings have been restored with informational displays. They are not open to the public however as North Oaks is private.  Two of the remaining structures, the Blacksmith Shop and Machine Shop and Dairy Building, are listed on the National Register of Historic Places.

In May 2008, NOHOA sent a letter to internet search company Google, stating that its Street View software contained images that violated their trespassing ordinance, and requested their removal. Google complied, so there is no street view available for the roads within North Oaks.

Geography

Demographics

2010 census
As of the census of 2010, there were 4,469 people, 1,746 households, and 1,378 families residing in the city. The racial makeup of the city was 93.0% White, 0.4% African American, 0.2% Native American, 5.2% Asian, 0.1% from other races, and 1.1% from two or more races. Hispanic or Latino of any race were 1.2% of the population.

There were 1,746 households, of which 27.5% had children under the age of 18 living with them, 74.3% were married couples living together, 3.1% had a female householder with no husband present, 1.5% had a male householder with no wife present, and 21.1% were non-families. 18.9% of all households were made up of individuals, and 14% had someone living alone who was 65 years of age or older. The average household size was 2.49 and the average family size was 2.84.

The median age in the city was 53.1 years. 20.9% of residents were under the age of 18; 4.1% were between the ages of 18 and 24; 11.7% were from 25 to 44; 37.7% were from 45 to 64; and 25.6% were 65 years of age or older. The gender makeup of the city was 48.2% male and 51.8% female.

2000 census
As of the census of 2000, there were 3,883 people, 1,300 households, and 1,177 families residing in the city. The racial makeup of the city was 93.33% White, 0.31% African American, 0.15% Native American, 4.61% Asian, 0.03% Pacific Islander, 0.57% from other races, and 1.00% from two or more races. Hispanic or Latino of any race were 1.21% of the population.

There were 1,300 households, out of which 41.5% had children under the age of 18 living with them, 86.5% were married couples living together, 2.6% had a female householder with no husband present, and 9.4% were non-families. 7.6% of all households were made up of individuals, and 3.2% had someone living alone who was 65 years of age or older.  The average household size was 2.92 and the average family size was 3.08.

In the city, the population was spread out, with 27.6% under the age of 18, 4.7% from 18 to 24, 17.6% from 25 to 44, 38.5% from 45 to 64, and 11.6% who were 65 years of age or older.  The median age was 45 years. For every 100 females, there were 99.2 males.  For every 100 females age 18 and over, there were 96.0 males.

The median income for a household in the city was $149,158, and the median income for a family was $152,380. Males had a median income of $100,000 versus $47,019 for females. The per capita income for the city was $72,686.  None of the families and 1.9% of the population were living below the poverty line, including no under-eighteens and 9.6% of those over 64.  North Oaks is listed among the highest-income places in the United States.

Sports

Golf
North Oaks Golf Club

Notable people    
 Marc Asch (born 1946), Minnesota state representative
 Sydney Brodt (Born 1998), ice hockey player with the PWHPA and the American National team 
 Mike Hoeffel (Born 1989), ice hockey player with the Iserlohn Roosters
 Paul Moga (Born 1972), Brigadier General in the United States Air Force, current Commandant of Cadets of the United States Air Force Academy, former F-22A Raptor demonstration pilot, and former Television show host.

References

Cities in Minnesota
Cities in Ramsey County, Minnesota